Helen Gourlay Cawley (née Gourlay; born 23 December 1946) is a retired tennis player from Australia.

Personal
Helen Gourlay was born in Launceston, Tasmania, Australia. She married Richard Leon Cawley in January 1977, and married William Timothy Cape in October 1986.

Career
Cawley reached the singles final of two Grand Slam tournaments, losing the 1971 French Open and the December 1977 Australian Open to countrywoman Evonne Goolagong Cawley (no relation).

An operation on her elbow sidelined her for 10 months in 1973.

In women's doubles, Cawley was a four-time winner of the Australian Open (1972, 1976, 1977 (January), 1977 (December)). She won Wimbledon in 1977 partnering JoAnne Russell and was the runner-up there in 1974 with Karen Krantzcke. Gourlay was twice the runner-up at the French Open in 1971 with Kerry Harris and 1977 with Rayni Fox. In 1977, Gourlay played in four of the five Grand Slam Women's Doubles finals (the Australian Open was contested twice), only failing to reach the US Open final, where she lost in the second round with JoAnne Russell.

Grand Slam finals

Singles (2 runner-ups)

Doubles (5 titles, 3 runner-ups)

Note:  Evonne Goolagong Cawley is occasionally credited incorrectly with winning the 1977 Ladies Doubles event at Wimbledon, due to the confusion regarding the married name of her compatriot Helen Gourlay who in fact took the trophy. Both women were listed in tournaments as Mrs. R. Cawley (Goolagong was Mrs. R.A.Cawley and Gourlay Mrs. R.L.Cawley). Goolagong Cawley did not participate at Wimbledon 1977.

Grand Slam singles tournament timeline 

Note: The Australian Open was held twice in 1977, in January and December.

Coaching
Gourlay was coached by Brian Hudson for over 10 years.  She lived with Brian, his wife Beryl and their children for three years while he coached her for free at his Granville (Sydney) tennis courts (1963-1965).  Gourlay and Brian played mixed doubles at White City (1968) and Wimbledon (1972). Gourlay was also coached by Brian at his Terranora court leading into many international events, including Gram Slams.   Brian coached Gourlay in the 1977 Australian Open, in which fifth-seeded Gourlay defeated second-seeded Sue Barker in the semi-final.

Gourlay was one of the inaugural coaches of the Australian Institute of Sport tennis program when it was established in Canberra in 1981. Gourlay left the program in 1986.

Recognition
In 1987 she was inducted into the Tasmanian Sporting Hall of Fame and in 2000 received the Australian Sports Medal.

See also 
 Performance timelines for all female tennis players who reached at least one Grand Slam final

References

External links
 
 
 

1946 births
Australian female tennis players
Australian Open (tennis) champions
Living people
Wimbledon champions
Sportspeople from Launceston, Tasmania
Sportswomen from Tasmania
Grand Slam (tennis) champions in women's doubles
Australian Institute of Sport coaches
Recipients of the Australian Sports Medal
Tennis people from Tasmania